The Al Saleel National Park is a wildlife reserve in the Sharqiyah region of Oman.

It is home to a number of rare species such as the Arabian gazelle, the Omani wild cat (“Al Senmar”) (Felis silvestris gordoni) and other animals which have made this environment their home, including the red fox, the Egyptian eagle (Neophron percnopterus) and others.

References

External links 
Nature reserves in Oman

Protected areas of Oman